Medieval Mayhem is an Atari 2600 video game.

Medieval Mayhem may also refer to:
 "Medieval Mayhem", a Dinner: Impossible episode
 "Medieval Mayhem", a segment of the 2009 Mythbusters episode "Exploding Bumper"
 "Medieval Mayhem", a game level of Crash Bash
 Slayers Medieval Mayhem, Slayers manga title